Cesare Orlandi (Città della Pieve, 26 luglio 1734 – Perugia, 20 dicembre 1779) was an Italian writer and historian. He was a nobleman of Fermo, Atri and Città della Pieve, and he's known only for his work Delle città d'Italia e sue isole adjacenti [sic] compendiose notizie (1770-1778), which contains comprehensive details and high-quality landscape views of many Italian cities (a landscape view is attached at the beginning of each section and for each city). It was published in volumes over almost a decade (1770-1778). He is likely to be the "Abatte Cesare Orlandi" who edited and published an edition of Cesare Ripa's "Iconology" in 1764, which contains a portrait.

His work remained unfinished due to the author's death, occurred in 1779, and the Italian cities covered in his work span from letter A (Volume I) to letter C (Volume V). The work is often a valuable source of information about the structure, architecture, history and social organization of many Italian cities up to the XVIII century.

Works

See also 
 Città della Pieve
 Perugia

References 

1734 births
1779 deaths
18th-century Italian writers
18th-century Italian male writers
18th-century Italian historians